is a 1997 Japanese film directed by Kōki Mitani. It was popular in Japan upon its release and won 3 Japanese Academy Awards for Best Screenplay, Best Sound, and Best Supporting Actor (Nishimura Masahiko).

Summary
A late-night live broadcast of a radio drama begins with none of the cast or crew being pleased with the project. When the lead actress Nokko Senbon (Keiko Toda) decides she won't play her role unless she's allowed to change her character's name, the whole cast eventually insists on changing various parts of the play to their liking. This begins a chain of events that completely changes every aspect of the story and requires the entire staff to participate in completing the drama, all while live on the air.

Cast

Release
Welcome Back, Mr. McDonald was released in Japan on November 8, 1997 where it was distributed by Toho.  The film was released by Tidepoint Pictures/Viz Film in the United States in 1999.

The film won the Best Screenplay award at the Mainichi Film Concours. At the Japanese Academy Awards,  Masahiko Nishimura won the award for Best Supporting Actor (also for Woman of the Police Protection Program) and for Most Popular Performer, and the film won for Best Sound.

References

Sources

External links 
 

Films directed by Kōki Mitani
Japanese comedy films
1990s Japanese-language films
1997 films
Films with screenplays by Kôki Mitani
Films scored by Takayuki Hattori